Anthony Muki Kimani Njenga is a Kenyan midfielder currently in the ranks of Kenyan Premier League side Nairobi City Stars from July 2019.

Muki, born and raised at Riruta in the periphery of Nairobi, was inspired to take up football by his elder sibling Francis Thairu.

Career 

He started off his football at Dagoretti Santos before joining World Hope in 2009 which was later rechristened to Nairobi City Stars.

In 2009 he was signed by Sofapaka by opted to return to City Stars for regular football as he felt he 'was not mature enough' to compete with the more seasoned players at the promoted side. He rejoined Sofapaka in 2010 and at the end of the season he was unanimously voted the Kenyan Premier League midfielder of 2010.

He stayed on at Sofapaka for another three seasons till the end of 2014. During his time at Batoto ba Mungu - as Sofa are fondly known - Muki also won the GOtv Shield midfielder award after his team lifted the 2013 edition.

He then crossed over to Coastal side Bandari in whom he served for two seasons before taking a break due to work related commitments. At the end of the season he led the side to the Domestic Cup.

After two and a half years Muki came out of the woods to return to competitive football by rejoining Nairobi City Stars for the 2019 season.

National team 

While at Sofapaka in 2010 he earned his debut call to the Kenya National team Harambee Stars by head coach Jacob Mulee and went on to earn his first cap in an international friendly against host Tanzania in Dar es Salaam on 29 November 2010.

He featured for Kenya in the 2010 and 2012 Cecafa Senior Challenge Cups in Tanzania and Uganda, respectively. In total he earned ten caps.

Honors

Individual
Sofapaka
2010 Kenyan Premier League - Midfielder of the Year
2012 Sofapaka vs Oserian MVP
2013 FKF President's Cup - Best Midfielder 
2015 FOYA - Best Midfielder nominee

Club
Sofapaka
Kenyan Super Cup: 2010
Kenyan Super Cup: 2011 
2013 FKF President's Cup
Bandari
2015 FKF President's Cup
Kenyan Super Cup: 2016

References

External links
Anthony Kimani at FoStats.com

Living people
1989 births
Kenyan footballers
Association football midfielders
Kenya international footballers
Nairobi City Stars players
Sofapaka F.C. players
Bandari F.C. (Kenya) players
Kenyan Premier League players
A.F.C. Leopards managers